The Frank L. Messa Rink at Achilles Center is a 2,225-seat multi-purpose arena in Schenectady, New York. It is home to the Union College Dutchmen ice hockey and Dutchwomen ice hockey teams, members of the ECAC Hockey League. The facility opened in 1975 as Achilles Rink and was named in honor of its original benefactor, the Rev. H. Laurence Achilles, Sr.  In 2003, it was renovated and renamed Frank L. Messa Rink at Achilles Center in honor of Frank L. Messa, class of 1973, whose generosity made the renovation possible.  One of the unique and distinguishing features of the building is its light colored wooden dome roof which is supported by a complex geometric pattern of dark colored wooden beams.  The arena also houses the Travis J. Clark '00 Strength Training Facility.

Renovations
During the summer of 2003, the rink underwent phase 1 of a $1.5 million renovation after a gift from alumnus Frank L. Messa '73.  Renamed Frank L. Messa Rink at Achilles Center, the renovated facility was officially unveiled for competition on October 18, 2003.  Improvements included a new ice sheet with state of the art chilling system, improved climate control, spring loaded boards, seamless glass, new overhead center scoreboard, reconfigured penalty boxes, more spacious aisles, and seating with improved sight lines.  Seating capacity was reduced from 2,504 to 2,225 to accommodate the changes.  Phase 2 of the project was completed during the 2003–2004 academic year and included construction of new locker rooms, a reconfigured lobby, a sports medicine area, and training facility.

In January 2016, a $10 million renovation plan for Achilles Center was announced by Union College Athletic Director Jim McLaughlin. The list of improvements for the project includes:  New ice sheet floor, sideboards & glass, new main entrance at south side of rink, new video scoreboard, new seating, new concession stands, new restroom facilities, new coaches offices and new hospitality room with views of the rink and football field.  Fundraising for the project has been approved but a time line for start of construction has not yet been announced.

References

1975 establishments in New York (state)
Buildings and structures in Schenectady, New York
College ice hockey venues in the United States
Indoor ice hockey venues in New York (state)
Sports venues completed in 1975
Sports venues in Schenectady County, New York
Union Dutchmen and Dutchwomen ice hockey